Allume Systems was a software developer, founded in 1988 by David Schargel and Jonathan Kahn in New York City as Aladdin Systems to develop, publish and distribute software for personal computers. Aladdin Systems was incorporated in January 1989.

In April 2004, the company was acquired by PC software publisher International Microcomputer Software Inc. (IMSI). A few months later in July, the company was forced to change its name from Aladdin Systems as part of a settlement of a trademark lawsuit with Aladdin Knowledge Systems. In 2005, Allume Systems was acquired by Smith Micro Software from IMSI.

Products 
As Aladdin Systems, they originally developed exclusively for Macintosh, focusing on data compression and management utilities, such as the StuffIt family of compression utilities and the StuffIt InstallerMaker delivery suite, the ShrinkWrap disk image utility, and its Spring Cleaning system optimization utility.

As Aladdin Systems, the company purchased the ShrinkWrap disk image utility from Macintosh shareware developer Chad Magendanz in 1996.

As early as 1995, Allume began to release some elements of StuffIt to Windows while not releasing the full StuffIt for Windows until 2000. StuffIt was later ported to both Linux and Solaris in 2001.  Under Smith Micro, both Unix products have since been discontinued.

By this time, Allume began to publish or distribute a full line of graphics, imaging, internet security, and utility software.

In response to the success of the popular marine aquarium fishtank simulator, they have also released their own line of fish sims known as Aquazone, which is not affiliated with the discontinued fish tank computer simulation from 9003.inc by the same name.

Smith Micro's latest versions of StuffIt are StuffIt Deluxe 2010 for Windows and StuffIt Deluxe 16 for Mac.

References

External links
Smith Micro Software

Watsonville, California
Companies based in Santa Cruz County, California
Software companies established in 1988
2005 mergers and acquisitions
Defunct software companies of the United States